"Lost Soul Survivor" is a song by American rapper YoungBoy Never Broke Again from his fourth studio album The Last Slimeto (2022). Produced by Andy Made The Beat, Bans, Cheese, and Saucey Beats, it peaked at number 75 on the Billboard Hot 100. The song serves as the eighth track to The Last Slimeto and sees YoungBoy rapping with a fast flow about the struggles in his life.

Composition
Robin Murray from Clash noted that the track is "submerged in effects." However, HipHopDXs Scott Glaysher noted that the track is a "prime example of these rap sermons."

Critical reception
HipHopDXs Scott Glaysher noted that the track "is quite rhythmic and delivers YoungBoy’s version of gangster rap psalms." Paul Simpson from AllMusic wrote "he switches between harder rapping and melodic crooning so frequently that one could easily mistake the songs for duets between different artists."

Personnel
Credits and personnel adapted from Tidal.

Musicians
 Jason Michael Goldberg – production, composer, songwriter
 Andy Chen – production, composer, songwriter
 Leonardo Mateus – production, composer, songwriter
 Aman Nikhanji – production, composer, songwriter
 Kentrell DeSean Gaulden – lead artist, songwriter, composer

Technical
 Cheese – mastering engineer
 Cheese – mixing engineer
 Cheese – recording engineer

Charts

References

2022 songs
YoungBoy Never Broke Again songs
Songs written by YoungBoy Never Broke Again